Ryff is a surname. Notable people with this surname include:

 Carol Ryff, American academic and psychologist
 Jean Ryff (1870–1944), Swiss football manager
 Petrus Ryff (1552–1629), Swiss mathematician, physician, and chronicler

See also
 Ruff (surname)